The Angelus is an Irish radio and television programme, first broadcast in 1950, of the sound of an Angelus bell ringing for one minute. On radio it is broadcast at 12pm and 6pm every day. On television, it is only broadcast at 6pm, immediately before the main evening news. Since 2009, the programme on television no longer includes Catholic imagery and the Angelus prayer itself is never broadcast.

The bells were recorded at St Mary's Pro-Cathedral, although initially broadcast live.

Radio Éireann first broadcast The Angelus on 15 August 1950. The Secretary of the Department of Posts and Telegraphs, Leon Ó Broin, and the Archbishop of Dublin, John Charles McQuaid, had discussed the original idea in the late 1940s.

The Catholic broadcast has sometimes been challenged, while some non-Catholic faith leaders have called for its continuation, notably the Church of Ireland (although less prominent than in the Roman Catholic church the Angelus is also part of the Anglican/Episcopal tradition) and the Presbyterian Church in Ireland. Archbishop Eames of the Church of Ireland welcomed the new version in 2009. The secretary of the mosque in Clonskeagh and the Chief Rabbi supported keeping the broadcast.

Television format
Televised programming began at Telefís Éireann's launch. Images shown were pictures of the Annunciation. More recently, it showed "a number of people of varying gender and ages pause to pray at the sound of the bell".

2009 relaunch
From 21 September 2009, RTÉ Television reformatted the broadcast before RTÉ News: Six One. It features seven different editions, with a different person shown in each one. Featured people include a chemist from Finglas, a mother from Sixmilebridge, grandparents feeding swans in Shannon, a fisherman from Enniscorthy and an office worker from Zambia at her office near the Phoenix Park. The one-minute feature attracts an average audience of 318,000. It was developed by Kairos Communications.

2015 revamp
From 2015, a new form of the Angelus, The People's Angelus, are transmitted on Fridays,  produced by ordinary people, artists, and aspiring filmmakers. Angelus films produced by Kairos are transmitted on the other days of the week.

References

External links
 Official site

1950 radio programme debuts
1950 establishments in Ireland
1960s Irish television series
1970s Irish television series
1980s Irish television series
1990s Irish television series
2000s Irish television series
2010s Irish television series
Irish religious television series
RTÉ Radio 1
RTÉ original programming